Montravel  may refer to:
 Montravel AOC, a French Bergerac AOC wine
 Anna Marie de Montravel, a rose cultivar named after a real person
 Lamothe-Montravel, a commune in the Dordogne department in Aquitaine in south-western France